Rise to the Occasion may refer to:

 "Rise to the Occasion" (Climie Fisher song), 1987
 "Rise to the Occasion" (BWO song), 2009
 Rise to the Occasion (album), a 2003 album by Jamaican artist Sizzla